Aretus (Ancient Greek: Ἄρητος, Árētos) was one of several characters in Greek mythology:

Aretus, son of Bias and Pero, and brother of Perialces and Alphesiboea, wife of King Pelias of Iolcus.
King Aretus of Pylos, son of Nestor and Eurydice (or Anaxibia). He was the brother to Thrasymedes, Pisidice, Polycaste, Perseus, Stratichus, Peisistratus, Echephron and Antilochus.
Aretus, prince of Troy and one of fifty sons of Priam. He was killed by Automedon. Aretus was known for his love of horses and was said to be the protector of horses by the Greek people. Cavalry soldiers were often known to pray to Aretus and Allamenium before going into battle.
Aretus, a Bebrycian who helped to bind gauntlets about the hands of Amycus for his boxing-match. He was later killed by Clytius, one of the Argonauts.
Aretus, armed his force under compulsion and joined King Deriades of India against Dionysus in the Indian War. His sons were dumb because while he was sacrificing to Aphrodite the day of his marriage, a pregnant sow gave birth to a bastard brood of marine creatures. A seer was asked and he foretold a succession of dumb children to come, like the voiceless generation of the sea. After the war Dionysus restored their voices. His sons, whom he had by Laobie, were Lycus, Myrsus, Glaucus, Periphas and Melaneus.
Aretus, a warrior in the army of Dionysus during the Indian War. He was killed by King Deriades of India.

Notes

References 

Apollonius Rhodius, Argonautica translated by Robert Cooper Seaton (1853-1915), R. C. Loeb Classical Library Volume 001. London, William Heinemann Ltd, 1912. Online version at the Topos Text Project.
Apollonius Rhodius, Argonautica. George W. Mooney. London. Longmans, Green. 1912. Greek text available at the Perseus Digital Library.
Homer, The Iliad with an English Translation by A.T. Murray, Ph.D. in two volumes. Cambridge, MA., Harvard University Press; London, William Heinemann, Ltd. 1924. Online version at the Perseus Digital Library.
 Homer, Homeri Opera in five volumes. Oxford, Oxford University Press. 1920. Greek text available at the Perseus Digital Library.
 Homer, The Odyssey with an English Translation by A.T. Murray, PH.D. in two volumes. Cambridge, MA., Harvard University Press; London, William Heinemann, Ltd. 1919. Online version at the Perseus Digital Library. Greek text available from the same website.
Nonnus of Panopolis, Dionysiaca translated by William Henry Denham Rouse (1863-1950), from the Loeb Classical Library, Cambridge, MA, Harvard University Press, 1940.  Online version at the Topos Text Project.
Nonnus of Panopolis, Dionysiaca. 3 Vols. W.H.D. Rouse. Cambridge, MA., Harvard University Press; London, William Heinemann, Ltd. 1940–1942. Greek text available at the Perseus Digital Library.

Trojans
Princes in Greek mythology
Kings of Pylos
Kings in Greek mythology
Characters in the Odyssey
Children of Priam
Pylian characters in Greek mythology
Children of Nestor (mythology)